South Carolina Highway 280 (SC 280) was a state highway located entirely within Beaufort County, South Carolina.  The entirety of the route was along Parris Island Gateway, which remains the name of the road despite the decommissioning of the route number.  The entirety of SC 280 is now U.S. Highway 21.

Route description 
SC 280 began at an intersection with South Carolina Highway 802 (now South Carolina Highway 128) in Shell Point and ran northward through western portions of Port Royal and Beaufort before reaching its terminus at US 21 in Burton.

History
In 2012, US 21 was re-routed around Beaufort in order to direct traffic headed towards the Sea Islands away from downtown.  US 21 was routed along the entire stretch of Parris Island Gateway en route towards Ribaut Road and Lady's Island Drive, thus eliminating the need to have an individual state highway number.  SCDOT decommissioned the route number but retains maintenance responsibility.

Major Intersections

References

280
Transportation in Beaufort County, South Carolina
U.S. Route 21